Amazonides tabida is a moth of the family Noctuidae. It is found in Mozambique and Senegal.

References

Moths described in 1852
Noctuinae
Lepidoptera of Mozambique
Moths of Sub-Saharan Africa